"This Is Our Punk-Rock," Thee Rusted Satellites Gather + Sing, is the third studio album by Canadian post-rock band The Silver Mt. Zion Memorial Orchestra & Tra-la-la Band (with choir). It was released August 25, 2003, in Europe and September 2, 2003, in the rest of the world by Constellation Records.

For this album, an amateur choir was assembled from a few dozen friends and colleagues. The liner notes contain a page of the score used by the choir in the opening track (the "fasola" section).

This album was essentially created as a requiem for open and abandoned spaces in Montreal (the band's home town), as well as for similar loss and decay around the world, due to either urban development or military action.

Track listing

Personnel
The Silver Mt. Zion Memorial Orchestra & Tra-la-la Band (with choir)
Thierry Amar – contrabass, vocals, mixing
Beckie Foon – cello, vocals, mixing
Ian Ilavsky – guitar, vocals, mixing
Efrim Menuck – guitar, piano, vocals, tapes, effects, mixing
Jessica Moss – violin, vocals, mixing
Sophie Trudeau – violin, vocals, mixing

Other musicians
Howard Bilerman – drums on "Sow Some Lonesome Corner So Many Flowers Bloom"
Aidan Girt – drums on "American Motor Over Smoldered Field"
Thee Rusted Satellite Choir – vocals on "Sow Some Lonesome Corner So Many Flowers Bloom" and "Goodbye Desolate Railyard"

Technical
Howard Bilerman – production, mixing
Harris Newman – mastering

References

Thee Silver Mt. Zion albums
2003 albums
Constellation Records (Canada) albums
Albums produced by Howard Bilerman